The Eurasian curlew or common curlew (Numenius arquata) is a very large wader in the  family Scolopacidae. It is one of the most widespread of the curlews, breeding across temperate Europe and Asia. In Europe, this species is often referred to just as the "curlew", and in Scotland known as the "whaup" in Scots.

Taxonomy
The Eurasian curlew was formally described by the Swedish naturalist Carl Linnaeus in 1758 in the tenth edition of his Systema Naturae under the binomial name Scolopax arquata. It is now placed with eight other curlews in the genus Numenius that was introduced by the French ornithologist Mathurin Jacques Brisson in 1760. The genus name Numenius is from Ancient Greek νουμήνιος, noumēnios, a bird mentioned by Hesychius. It is associated with the curlew because it appears to be derived from neos, "new" and mene "moon", referring to the crescent-shaped bill. The species name arquata is the Medieval Latin name for this bird, derived from Latin arcuatus, "bow-shaped", and again referring to the shape of the bill.

The English name "curlew" is imitative of the Eurasian curlew's call, but may have been influenced by the Old French corliu, "messenger", from courir , "to run".  It was first recorded in 1377 in Langland's Piers Plowman "Fissch to lyue in þe flode..Þe corlue by kynde of þe eyre".

Three subspecies are recognised:

 N. a. arquata, (Linnaeus, 1758) – breeds in west, north & central Europe
 N. a. orientalis, Brehm – 1831 – breeds in west & central Siberia through to Northeast China
 N. a. suschkini, Neumann, 1929 – breeds from western Kazakhstan to southwestern Siberia

Description
It is mainly greyish brown, with a white back, greyish-blue legs and a very long curved bill. Males and females look identical, but the bill is longest in the adult female. It is generally not possible to recognize the sex of a single Eurasian curlew, or even several ones, as there is much variation; telling male and female of a mated pair apart is usually possible however. The familiar call is a loud curloo-oo.

The only similar species over most of the curlew's range is the Eurasian whimbrel (Numenius phaeopus). The whimbrel is smaller and has a shorter bill with a kink rather than a smooth curve. Flying curlews may also resemble bar-tailed godwits (Limosa lapponica) in their winter plumages; however, the latter have a smaller body, a slightly upturned beak, and legs that do not reach far beyond their tail tips. The Eurasian curlew's feet are longer, forming a conspicuous "point".

Distribution and habitat
The curlew exists as a migratory species over most of its range, wintering in Africa, southern Europe and south Asia. Occasionally a vagrant individual reaches places far from its normal range, such as Nova Scotia and the Marianas. It is present all year in the milder climates of Ireland and the United Kingdom and its adjacent European coasts.

Behaviour and ecology
The Eurasian curlew is generally wary. It is highly gregarious outside the breeding season.

Breeding
The nest is a bare scrape on taiga, meadow, and similar habitats. The clutch size of the curlew consists of 4 eggs which are laid in April or May and incubates them for about a month until they begin to hatch. It has been observed that curlews tend to nest close to common kestrel's nests, as they can offer protection from other predators, such as corvids, even though kestrels also predate curlew nests.

Food and feeding
The Eurasian curlew feeds by probing soft mud for small invertebrates, but will also pick small crabs and earthworms from the surface if the opportunity arises.

Predation 
Eurasian curlews eggs are predated by foxes and predatory birds. In addition sheep have been recorded by the BBC nature series Springwatch predating the eggs.

Status
The Eurasian curlew was formerly listed as a species of Least Concern by the IUCN, owing to its expansive range and relatively large population. However, the population of the Eurasian curlew was noticed to be declining at a very rapid rate. Following the evaluation of its population trend, the classification was found to be outdated, and it was consequently promoted to Near Threatened status in 2008. Though it is a common bird, its numbers are noticeably declining, particularly in the United Kingdom and Ireland, which have about a quarter of the global population. In the twenty years up to 2016, the population is estimated to have declined by more than 50% in England and Scotland, more than 80% in Wales, and more than 90% in Ireland. At the end of 2015 it was placed on the United Kingdom's red list of most endangered bird species. The curlew is one of the species to which the Agreement on the Conservation of African-Eurasian Migratory Waterbirds (AEWA) applies.

Research by scientists at the British Trust for Ornithology suggests that curlew populations in the UK have been negatively affected in areas with high levels of arable farming and afforestation which have reduced its natural habitats of open grasslands.

Gallery

References

External links

 Conserving breeding curlews in Southern England
 (Eurasian) curlew species text in The Atlas of Southern African Birds
 Video of a Curlew Probing the Mud in the Thames Estuary
 
 
 
 
 
 
 

Eurasian curlew
Birds of Eurasia
Birds of Africa
Eurasian curlew
Eurasian curlew